Ethocybin (CEY-19; 4-phosphoryloxy-DET; 4-PO-DET) is a homologue of the mushroom alkaloid psilocybin, and a semi-synthetic psychedelic alkaloid of the tryptamine family. Effects of ethocybin are comparable to those of a shorter LSD or psilocybin trip, although intensity and duration vary depending on dosage, individual physiology, and set and setting.

Chemistry 
As with psilocybin, miprocybin and metocybin, ethocybin is a prodrug that is converted into the pharmacologically active compound ethocin in the body by dephosphorylation. This chemical reaction takes place under strongly acidic conditions or enzymatically by phosphatases in the body.

Albert Hofmann was the first to produce this chemical, soon after his discovery of psilocin and psilocybin. It was sold under the code name CEY-39.

Pharmacology 

As with psilocybin, ethocybin is rapidly dephosphorylated in the body to 4-HO-DET  which then acts as a partial agonist at the 5-HT2A serotonin receptor in the brain where it mimics the effects of serotonin (5-HT).

Medicine 

Ethocybin has been studied as a treatment for several disorders since the early 1960s, and numerous papers are devoted to this material.  Its short-lived action was considered a virtue. A 2010 Study showed that Ethocybin helped with bipolar affective disorder.

Effects 

Ethocybin is absorbed through the lining of the mouth and stomach. Effects begin 20–45 minutes after ingestion, and last from 2–4 hours depending on dose, species, and individual metabolism.  The effects are somewhat shorter compared to psilocybin.

Pharmacology 

Ethocybin is probably metabolized mostly in the liver where it becomes ethocin, but is also broken down by the enzyme monoamine oxidase.

Mental and physical tolerance to psilocybin builds and dissipates quickly. Taking ethocybin more than three or four times in a week (especially two days in a row) can result in diminished effects. Tolerance dissipates after a few days, so frequent users often keep doses spaced five to seven days apart to avoid the effect.

Legality 

Ethocybin is not controlled in the US, but possession or sale may be considered illegal under the Federal Analog Act.

References

Alkaloids
Psychedelic tryptamines
Designer drugs
Organophosphates
Diethylamino compounds